Ramaroshan is located in Achham district of Nepal at the altitude of 2500m. A place having 18 patch of meadows (locally known as patans), is a major tourism site of Achham district. This area is the one of the habitat of national bird of Nepal, Danfe (Lophophorus). A good view of Budhiganga basin, along with the peaks of Mount Api, and Mount Saipal can be seen from Ramaroshan area.

Introduction
Ramaroshan is a main attraction of Achham District. It is known as land of 12 lakes and 18 patch of meadows (grassland) with stiff rocky cliffs. Jigale lake is the largest lake in this area which has the shape of English letter C whereas Taune lake is the smallest one. Among the 18 patans, Kinemine patan is the largest patan, possibly the largest patan in the Achham District through which the Kailash river flows. This place is surrounded by a forest. Terraced hill slopes with lush green landscape surrounding the enchanting Ramaroshan Lake attracts everyone. On the route to this destination, travellers come across the forest of Rhododendron. Boating has been started since 2020 and people can encounter Himalayan Munal{National bird of Nepal}

Flora
Many species of plants are found in Ramaroshan area. Mostly lakes have been covered by various types of flowers. Many wild animals graze in the grassland of Ramaroshan.

Fauna
It is a habitat of various wild animal i.e. bear, wild cat, musk deer etc. Ramaroshan is also a habitat for various birds like lophophorous, pheasant, cuckoo etc.

Gallery

See also
List of lakes of Nepal

References

Achham District
Lakes of Sudurpashchim Province